The Donghai Bridge Wind Farm is a 102 MW offshore wind farm close to the Donghai Bridge, Shanghai and is capable of powering 200,000 households.  It started producing and transmitting power to the mainland grid on July 6, 2010. It is the first commercial offshore wind farm in China.

See also

 Wind power in China
 List of wind farms in China

References

External links
LORC Knowledge - Datasheet for Donghai Bridge Wind Farm
 上海东海大桥10万千瓦海上风电示范项目

Offshore wind farms
Wind farms in China
2010 establishments in China
Energy infrastructure completed in 2010